Yu Guirui (born 1959) is a Chinese scientist currently serving as researcher and deputy director of the Institute of Geographical Sciences and Natural Resource Research, Chinese Academy of Sciences (CAS).

Biography
Yu was born in Pulandian District, Dalian, Liaoning, in 1959. He received his master's degree in crop cultivation and farming and doctor's degree in soil physics and amelioration from Shenyang Agricultural University in 1984 and 1993, respectively. After graduation, he taught there. He pursued advanced studies at Chiba University in 1991, earning his doctor's degree in environmental physics in 1997. Then he was an associate professor at the Faculty of Horticulture, Chiba University.

Yu returned to China in 1998 and that same year became a researcher at the Institute of Geographical Sciences and Natural Resource Research, Chinese Academy of Sciences (CAS). In 2014 he was hired as a professor at the University of Chinese Academy of Sciences.

Yu is a member of the Jiusan Society.

Honours and awards
 2002 National Science Fund for Distinguished Young Scholars
 2011 State Natural Science Award (Second Class) 
 November 22, 2019 Member of the Chinese Academy of Sciences (CAS)

References

External links
Yu Guirui on the Institute of Geographical Sciences and Natural Resource Research, Chinese Academy of Sciences (CAS) 
Yu Guirui on the Institute of Geographical Sciences and Natural Resource Research, Chinese Academy of Sciences (CAS) 

1959 births
Living people
People from Dalian
Scientists from Liaoning
Shenyang Agricultural University alumni
Chiba University alumni
Academic staff of the University of the Chinese Academy of Sciences
Members of the Chinese Academy of Sciences
Educators from Liaoning